Sintula is a genus of sheet weavers that was first described by Eugène Louis Simon in 1884.

Species
 it contains eighteen species, found in Europe, Russia, Morocco, Algeria, and Tunisia:
Sintula corniger (Blackwall, 1856) (type) – Europe, Turkey, Caucasus
Sintula cretaensis Wunderlich, 1995 – Greece (Crete)
Sintula criodes (Thorell, 1875) – Ukraine
Sintula cristatus Wunderlich, 1995 – Turkey
Sintula diceros Simon, 1926 – France, Spain
Sintula furcifer (Simon, 1911) – Portugal, Spain, Morocco, Algeria
Sintula iberica Bosmans, 2010 – Portugal, Spain
Sintula karineae Lecigne, 2021 – Turkey
Sintula orientalis Bosmans, 1991 – Algeria
Sintula oseticus Tanasevitch, 1990 – Russia (Caucasus)
Sintula pecten Wunderlich, 2011 – Canary Is.
Sintula penicilliger (Simon, 1884) – Algeria
Sintula pseudocorniger Bosmans, 1991 – Algeria, Tunisia
Sintula retroversus (O. Pickard-Cambridge, 1875) – Europe, Turkey, Caucasus
Sintula roeweri Kratochvíl, 1935 – Montenegro
Sintula solitarius Gnelitsa, 2012 – Ukraine
Sintula spiniger (Balogh, 1935) – Austria to Greece and Russia (Europe)
Sintula subterminalis Bosmans, 1991 – Algeria

See also
 List of Linyphiidae species (Q–Z)

References

Araneomorphae genera
Linyphiidae
Spiders of Africa
Spiders of Asia